Balu Balachandran is a Distinguished Fellow and the Group Leader for the Ceramics and Covetic Materials group in the Applied Materials Division at Argonne National Laboratory, Chicago, USA.

Education 
He received his Bachelor of Engineering (BE) degree in Metallurgical Engineering in 1975 from National Institute of Technology, Tiruchirappalli, Master of Science (MS) in Metallurgical Engineering from Indian Institute of Science and Doctor of Philosophy (PhD) in Materials Science and Engineering in 1980 from OGI School of Science and Engineering, Oregon, USA.

Awards 
Dr. Balachandran received many awards and recognition:

 2014, Argonne Distinguished Fellow
 2014, Distinguished Alumni Award, National Institute of Technology, Tiruchirappalli
 2006, Fellow, Institute of Physics 
 1999, Fellow of the American Ceramic Society
 1996, University of Chicago’s Distinguished Performance Award
R&D 100 Awards – Four Awards (The R&D 100 Awards are internationally recognized as the “Oscars of Innovation.” They have been awarded for the best high-technology inventions in a given year since 1962).
 2011, R&D 100 Award for the development of advanced ceramic capacitors for power inverters
 2004, R&D 100 Award for the development of hydrogen transport membranes
 1995, R&D 100 Award for developing dense ceramic membranes for natural gas conversion
 1993, R&D 100 Award for developing an efficient new production process for high-Tc powders
Federal Laboratory Consortium (FLC) Awards for Excellence in Technology Transfer – Two Awards (Awards given by FLC for transferring technology to industry)
 1996, Award for Excellence in Tech Transfer for transferring the process to manufacture phase-pure high-Tc powders to industry
 1995, Award for Excellence in Tech Transfer for transferring membrane technology to industry
FLC Awards of Merit – Two Awards (Awards given by FLC for transferring technology to industry)
 1994, Award of Merit for transferring the superconductor powder process
 1992, Award of Merit for transferring the cryogenic current lead technology

References 

Indian American
Argonne National Laboratory people
National Institute of Technology, Tiruchirappalli alumni
Oregon Health & Science University alumni
Indian Institute of Science alumni
Living people
Year of birth missing (living people)
Fellows of the American Ceramic Society